Bengt Conny Mikael Månsson (born 4 January 1980) is a Swedish football player most recently playing as a goalkeeper for Kristiansund.

Career
On 3 January 2019 it was announced, that Kristiansund BK wouldn't extend Månsson's contract, that just expired.

Career statistics

References

External links

 

1980 births
Living people
Swedish footballers
Association football goalkeepers
Kristiansund BK players